Voyager of the Seas is the lead ship of the  of cruise ships operated by Royal Caribbean International (RCI).  Constructed by Kværner Masa-Yards at its Turku New Shipyard in Turku, Finland, she was launched on November 27, 1998, and formally named by Olympic figure skater Katarina Witt on November 20, 1999.

Royal Caribbean Line announced the suspension until June 13, 2020, due to the COVID-19 pandemic.

History

The ship was constructed in Turku shipyard and completed its construction in November 1998 in Turku New Shipyard, Finland and launched on November 27, 1998, and formally named by Olympic figure skater Katarina Witt on November 20, 1999. Upon her departure on her maiden voyage the following day, November 21, 1999, Voyager of the Seas was the largest cruise ship in the world, although she was overtaken the following year by her sister ship . It can hold 3,602 passengers at double occupancy, and 4000 passengers maximum.

The investment manager Mario Salcedo began an over 20-year period of living on Royal Caribbean cruise ships after sailing in 2000 on Voyager of the Seas, which impressed him. Salcedo said in a 2016 interview, "It was the biggest cruise ship in the world at the time, and so revolutionary—the first ice skating rink, the first rock climbing wall, so many elements that took cruising to another dimension."

Design
Voyager of the Seas included the first rock climbing wall (mounted on the funnel) and the first ice-skating rink at sea.

In October and November 2014, Voyager of the Seas underwent a refit. The modifications included the installation of an outdoor movie screen near the pool and replacing the inline skating track with a flowrider surf simulator.

Voyager of the Seas underwent a US$97 million refit in September 2019 which included the addition of 72 passenger cabins and water slides. It was revamped again in January 2020 on the ice rinks and slide with $142m on the Brisbane to Sydney.

Route
Voyager of the Seas was chartered for Indian passengers in May 2016. The ship made a maiden call in July 2018, and called the largest cruise ship to call at a Filipino port when it arrived in Manila, Philippines for the first time. It sailed in the Southeast Asia in September 2018 to June 2019, and made a homeport to Sydney at 2019. The ship made a maiden call after it arrived in Bintan Island, Indonesia for the first time. The ship is the first cruise liner visit in 2020, when it berthed at the Port of Lautoka with 3853 passengers. It sailed in Tokyo, Japan during the summer of 2020, and is set to call in Shanghai in the summer of 2021.

Incidents
In December 2014, many passengers claimed that they are ill and has been diagnosed with whooping cough in the ship, it failed to detect the outbreak during the destination of Singapore to Sydney.

In October 2018, the passengers were horrified when 1,300 workers from the Indian tobacco company Kamla Pasand boarded the ship and blocked them from using some facilities.

In May 2019, two male passengers from Singapore died of unrelated natural causes while on board the ship.

2020: spread of COVID-19

Thousands of passengers of cruise ships that disembarked at Sydney, Australia in March 2020 were told to isolate due to COVID-19 fears. Passengers disembarked from Voyager of the Seas on March 18. A Toowoomba, Queensland man was infected on the ship and was sent into intensive care unit of a Toowoomba hospital after disembarking but died. the two cases of outbreak in Tasmania were linked to the ship. On 2 April 34 passengers and 5 crew members had tested positively for the virus in New South Wales alone. On 9 April, Ovation of the Seas transferred its 880 Filipino crew members into Voyager of the Seas to send them back to their country while off the coast of Indonesia, and sailed in Manila, Philippines on April 19. On 23 April, 79-year-old New Zealand man died from the disease while his wife had also been infected.

References

Bibliography

External links

 Official website

Ships of Royal Caribbean International
Ships built in Turku
1998 ships
Cruise ships involved in the COVID-19 pandemic